The Royal Albert Hall is a concert hall on the northern edge of South Kensington, London. One of the UK's most treasured and distinctive buildings, it is held in trust for the nation and managed by a registered charity which receives no government funding. It has a seating capacity of 5,272 people.

Since the hall's opening by Queen Victoria in 1871, the world's leading artists from many performance genres have appeared on its stage. It is the venue for the BBC Proms concerts, which have been held there every summer since 1941. It is host to more than 390 shows in the main auditorium annually, including classical, rock and pop concerts, ballet, opera, film screenings with live orchestral accompaniment, sports, awards ceremonies, school and community events, and charity performances and banquets. A further 400 events are held each year in the non-auditorium spaces. Over its 151 year history the hall has hosted people from various fields, including meetings by Suffragettes, speeches from Winston Churchill and Albert Einstein, fights by Lennox Lewis, exhibition bouts by Muhammad Ali, and concerts from regular performers at the venue such as Eric Clapton and Shirley Bassey.

The hall was originally supposed to have been called the Central Hall of Arts and Sciences, but the name was changed to the Royal Albert Hall of Arts and Sciences by Queen Victoria upon laying the Hall's foundation stone in 1867, in memory of her husband, Prince Albert, who had died six years earlier. It forms the practical part of a memorial to the Prince Consort; the decorative part is the Albert Memorial directly to the north in Kensington Gardens, now separated from the Hall by Kensington Gore.

History

1800s
In 1851 the Great Exhibition, organised by Prince Albert, the Prince Consort, was held in Hyde Park, London. The Exhibition was a success and led Prince Albert to propose the creation of a group of permanent facilities for the public benefit, which came to be known as Albertopolis. The Exhibition's Royal Commission bought Gore House, but it was slow to act, and in 1861 Prince Albert died without having seen his ideas come to fruition. However, a memorial was proposed for Hyde Park, with a Great Hall opposite.

The proposal was approved, and the site was purchased with some of the profits from the Exhibition. The Hall was designed by civil engineers Captain Francis Fowke and Major-General Henry Y. D. Scott of the Royal Engineers and built by Lucas Brothers. The designers were heavily influenced by ancient amphitheatres but had also been exposed to the ideas of Gottfried Semper while he was working at the South Kensington Museum. The recently opened Cirque d'Hiver in Paris was seen in the contemporary press as the design to outdo. The Hall was constructed mainly of Fareham Red brick, with terra cotta block decoration made by Gibbs and Canning of Tamworth.

The dome (designed by Rowland Mason Ordish) was made of wrought iron and glazed. There was a trial assembly of the dome's iron framework in Manchester; then it was taken apart again and transported to London by horse and cart. When the time came for the supporting structure to be removed from the dome after reassembly in situ, only volunteers remained on site in case the structure collapsed. The Hall was scheduled to be completed by Christmas Day 1870, and the Queen visited a few weeks beforehand to inspect.

The official opening ceremony of the Hall was on 29 March 1871. This had originally been scheduled for 1 May, the twentieth anniversary of the opening of the Great Exhibition, but was brought forward at the request of Queen Victoria. A welcoming speech was given by Edward, the Prince of Wales because the Queen was too overcome to speak; "her only recorded comment on the Hall was that it reminded her of the British constitution".

In the concert that followed, the Hall's acoustic problems immediately became apparent. Engineers first tried to remove the strong echo by suspending a canvas awning below the dome. This helped and also sheltered concert-goers from the sun, but the problem was not solved: it used to be jokingly said the Hall was "the only place where a British composer could be sure of hearing his work twice".

In July 1871, French organist Camille Saint-Saëns performed Church Scene from Faust by Charles Gounod; The Orchestra described his performance as "an exceptional and distinguished performer ... the effect was most marvellous."

Initially lit by gas, the Hall contained a special system by which thousands of gas jets were lit within ten seconds. Though it was demonstrated as early as 1873 in the Hall, full electric lighting was not installed until 1888. During an early trial when a partial installation was made, one disgruntled patron wrote to The Times, declaring it to be "a very ghastly and unpleasant innovation".

In May 1877, Richard Wagner himself conducted the first half of each of the eight concerts which made up the Grand Wagner Festival. After his turn with the baton, he handed it over to conductor Hans Richter and sat in a large armchair on the corner of the stage for the rest of each concert. Wagner's wife Cosima, the daughter of Hungarian virtuoso pianist and composer Franz Liszt, was among the audience.

The Wine Society was founded at the Hall on 4 August 1874, after large quantities of cask wine were found in the cellars. A series of lunches were held to publicise the wines, and General Henry Scott proposed a co-operative company to buy and sell wines.

1900s

In 1906 Elsie Fogerty founded the Central School of Speech and Drama at the Hall, using its West Theatre, now the Elgar Room, as the school's theatre. The school moved to Swiss Cottage in north London in 1957. Whilst the school was based at the Royal Albert Hall, students who graduated from its classes included Judi Dench, Vanessa Redgrave, Lynn Redgrave, Harold Pinter, Laurence Olivier and Peggy Ashcroft.

In 1911 Russian pianist and composer Sergei Rachmaninoff performed as a part of the London Ballad Concert. The recital included his 'Prelude in C-sharp minor' and 'Elegie in E-flat minor' (both from Morceaux de Fantaisie).

In 1933 German physicist Albert Einstein led the 'Einstein Meeting' at the hall for the Council for Assisting Refugee Academics, a British charity.

In 1936, the Hall was the scene of a giant rally celebrating the British Empire on the occasion of the centenary of Joseph Chamberlain's birth. In October 1942, the Hall suffered minor damage during World War II bombing, but in general was left mostly untouched as German pilots used the distinctive structure as a landmark.

In 1949 the canvas awning was removed and replaced with fluted aluminium panels below the glass roof, in a new attempt to cure the echo; but the acoustics were not properly tackled until 1969 when large fibreglass acoustic diffusing discs (commonly referred to as "mushrooms" or "flying saucers") were installed below the ceiling. In 1968, the Hall hosted the Eurovision Song Contest 1968 and from 1969 to 1988 the Miss World contest was staged in the venue. On 25 November 1969 it was the venue for the final date of the farewell tour by British rock "supergroup" Cream, which was also recorded and filmed in colour. In 1995, Greek keyboardist Yanni performed a concert there for his World Tour; the concert was recorded under the name of Live at Royal Albert Hall.

In the 1970s (1970–76) the hall hosted the Rothmans International Tennis Tournament, an indoor tournament which from 1973 was part of the World Championship Tennis circuit.

From 1996 until 2004, the Hall underwent a programme of renovation and development supported by a £20 million grant from the Heritage Lottery Fund and £20m from Arts Council England to enable it to meet the demands of the next century of events and performances. Thirty "discreet projects" were designed and supervised by the architecture and engineering firm BDP without disrupting events. These projects included improved ventilation to the auditorium, more bars and restaurants, improved seating, better technical facilities, and improved backstage areas. Internally, the Circle seating was rebuilt during June 1996 to provide more legroom, better access, and improved sightlines.

2000s
The largest project of the ongoing renovation and development was the building of a new south porch – door 12, accommodating a first-floor restaurant, new ground floor box office and subterranean loading bay. Although the exterior of the building was largely unchanged, the south steps leading down to Prince Consort Road were demolished to allow construction of underground vehicle access and a loading bay with accommodation for three HGVs carrying all the equipment brought by shows. The steps were then reconstructed around a new south porch, named The Meitar Foyer after a significant donation from Mr & Mrs Meitar. The porch was built on a similar scale and style to the three pre-existing porches at Door 3, 6 and 9: these works were undertaken by Taylor Woodrow Construction. On 4 June 2004, the project received the Europa Nostra Award for remarkable achievement.

The East (Door 3) and West (Door 9) porches were glazed and new bars opened along with ramps to improve disabled access. The Stalls were rebuilt in a four-week period in 2000 using steel supports allowing more space underneath for two new bars; 1,534 unique pivoting seats were laid – with an addition of 180 prime seats. The Choirs were rebuilt at the same time. The whole building was redecorated in a style that reinforces its Victorian identity.  of new carpets were laid in the rooms, stairs, and corridors – specially woven with a border that follows the oval curve of the building.

Between 2002 and 2004, there was a major rebuilding of the great organ (known as the Voice of Jupiter), built by "Father" Henry Willis in 1871 and rebuilt by Harrison & Harrison in 1924 and 1933. The rebuilding was performed by Mander Organs, and it is now the second-largest pipe organ in the British Isles with 9,999 pipes in 147 stops. The largest is the Grand Organ in Liverpool Cathedral which has 10,268 pipes.

During the first half of 2011, changes were made to the backstage areas to relocate and increase the size of crew catering areas under the South Steps away from the stage and create additional dressing rooms nearer to the stage.

From January to May 2013, the Box Office area at Door 12 underwent further modernisation to include a new Café Bar on the ground floor, a new Box Office with shop counters and additional toilets. The design and construction were carried out by contractor 8Build. Upon opening it was renamed 'The Zvi and Ofra Meitar Porch and Foyer.' owing to a large donation from the couple.

In Autumn 2013, work began on replacing the Victorian steam heating system over three years and improving cooling across the building. This work followed the summer Proms season during which temperatures were unusually high. Further heatwaves in 2018 and 2019 led to a rebuild of the Rausing Circle level with air-cooling ventilation installed, significantly decreasing heat there during hot weather.

In 2017 work began on a two-story  basement extension for use as backstage and archival space to the south-west quadrant of the building. The project is nicknamed the "Great Excavation", in reference to the Great Exhibition of 1851, and was planned to be complete for the Halls 150th anniversary in 2021.

In 2018 a Walk of Fame was unveiled at the Hall, with the first eleven recipients of a star including the Suffragettes (who held meetings at the Hall), Winston Churchill and Albert Einstein (both of whom delivered speeches here), Muhammad Ali (who had exhibition events at a venue he dubbed a 'helluva hall'), and Eric Clapton (who has played the venue over 200 times), among others, who were viewed as "key players" in the building's history.

Due to the COVID-19 pandemic, restrictions meant the Hall was closed in March 2020 for the first time since the Second World War. During winter 2020 it reopened for three socially distanced performances but was then closed for a second period, finally reopening to full capacity in July 2021.

Design

The Hall was originally designed with a capacity for 8,000 people and has accommodated as many as 12,000 (although present-day safety restrictions mean the maximum permitted capacity is now 5,272 including standing in the Gallery).

Around the outside of the building is 800-foot–long terracotta mosaic frieze, depicting "The Triumph of Arts and Sciences", in reference to the Hall's dedication. Proceeding anti-clockwise from the north side the sixteen subjects of the frieze are:
 Various Countries of the World bringing in their Offerings to the Exhibition of 1851
 Music
 Sculpture
 Painting
 Princes, Art Patrons and Artists
 Workers in Stone
 Workers in Wood and Brick
 Architecture
 The Infancy of the Arts and Sciences
 Agriculture
 Horticulture and Land Surveying
 Astronomy and Navigation
 A Group of Philosophers, Sages and Students
 Engineering
 The Mechanical Powers
 Pottery and Glassmaking

Above the frieze is an inscription in  terracotta letters that combine historical fact and Biblical quotations: 

Below the Arena floor there is room for two 4000 gallon water tanks, which are used for shows that flood the arena like Madame Butterfly.

Events

The Hall has been affectionately titled "The Nation's Village Hall". The first concert was Arthur Sullivan's cantata On Shore and Sea, performed on 1 May 1871.

Many events are promoted by the Hall, whilst since the early 1970s promoter Raymond Gubbay has brought a range of events to the Hall including opera, ballet and classical music. Some events include classical and rock concerts, conferences, banquets, ballroom dancing, poetry recitals, educational talks, motor shows, ballet, opera, film screenings and circus shows. It has hosted many sporting events, including boxing, squash, table tennis, basketball, wrestling including the first sumo wrestling tournament to be held in London as well as UFC 38 (the first UFC event to be held in the UK), tennis, and even a marathon.

The hall first hosted boxing in 1918, when it hosted a tournament between British and American servicemen. There was a colour bar in place at the Hall, preventing black boxers from fighting there, between 1923 and 1932. Greats of British boxing such as Frank Bruno, Prince Naseem Hamed, Henry Cooper and Lennox Lewis have all appeared at the venue. In 1982, the sporting events namely badminton team world cup also called Thomas Cup. The hall's storied boxing history was halted in 1999 when it lost its licence to hold boxing and wrestling matches after complaints from residents about noise levels. In 2011, after a legal battle, the licence to host boxing and wrestling events was restored and boxing events resumed in 2012. In 2019 Nicola Adams won the WBO Flyweight title which was the first fight for a world title at the venue since Marco Antonio Barrera took on Paul Lloyd in 1999.

On 6 April 1968, the Hall hosted the Eurovision Song Contest which was broadcast in colour for the first time. The first Miss World contest broadcast in colour was also staged at the venue in 1969 and remained at the Hall every year until 1989. Renowned Indian artist MS Subbulakshmi performed here in the year 1982.

One notable event was a Pink Floyd concert held 26 June 1969, the night they were banned from ever playing at the Hall again after shooting cannons, nailing things to the stage, and having a man in a gorilla suit roam the audience. At one point, Rick Wright went to the pipe organ and began to play "The End of the Beginning", the final part of "Saucerful of Secrets", joined by the brass section of the Royal Philharmonic Orchestra (led by the conductor, Norman Smith) and the ladies of the Ealing Central Amateur Choir. A portion of the pipe organ recording is included on Pink Floyd's album The Endless River. In 2006, Pink Floyd guitarist David Gilmour performed at the Hall for the first time since Pink Floyd's 1969 ban. He performed at the Hall as part of his On an Island Tour. The shows were filmed and used for the live video release, Remember That Night (2007). Rock band The Killers recorded their first live album, Live from the Royal Albert Hall in July 2009.

Between 1996 and 2008, the Hall hosted the annual National Television Awards all of which were hosted by Sir Trevor McDonald.

Benefit concerts include the 1997 Music for Montserrat concert, arranged and produced by George Martin, an event which featured artists such as Phil Collins, Mark Knopfler, Sting, Elton John, Eric Clapton, and Paul McCartney, and 2012 Sunflower Jam charity concert with Queen guitarist Brian May performing alongside bassist John Paul Jones of Led Zeppelin, drummer Ian Paice of Deep Purple, and vocalists Bruce Dickinson of Iron Maiden, and Alice Cooper.

On 2 October 2011, the Hall staged the 25th-anniversary performance of Andrew Lloyd Webber's The Phantom of the Opera, which was broadcast live to cinemas across the world and filmed for DVD. Lloyd Webber, the original London cast including Sarah Brightman and Michael Crawford, and four previous actors of the titular character, among others, were in attendance – Brightman and the previous Phantoms (aside from Crawford) performed an encore.

On 22 September 2011, Adele performed a one-night-only concert as part of her tour. The concert was filmed for DVD and screened at cinemas in 26 cities around the world. Her performance debuted at number one in the United States with 96,000 copies sold, the highest one-week tally for a music DVD in four years. After one week, it became the best-selling music DVD of 2011. As of 28 November 2012, it had surpassed sales of one million copies in the United States and sales of three million copies worldwide and makes the first music DVD to surpass sales of one million in the USA since Eagles' Farewell 1 Tour-Live from Melbourne in 2005 (Garth Brooks' The Ultimate Hits sold one million copies in 2007, but was a CD/DVD combination). The live version of "Set Fire to the Rain" taken from her performance won the Grammy Award for Best Pop Solo Performance at the 55th Annual Grammy Awards in 2013.

On 24 September 2012, Classic FM celebrated the 20th anniversary of their launch with a concert at the Hall. The program featured live performances of works by Handel, Puccini, Rachmaninoff, Parry, Vaughan Williams, Tchaikovsky and Karl Jenkins who conducted his piece The Benedictus from The Armed Man in person.

On 19 November 2012, the Hall hosted the 100th-anniversary performance of the Royal Variety Performance, attended by the HM Queen Elizabeth II and HRH Prince Philip, Duke of Edinburgh, with boy-band One Direction among the performers.

At a press conference held at the Hall in October 2016, Phil Collins announced his return to live performing with his Not Dead Yet Tour, which began in June 2017. The tour included five nights at the Hall which sold out in fifteen seconds.

Also in 2017, the Hall hosted the 70th British Academy Film Awards, often referred to as the BAFTAs, for the first time in 20 years, replacing the Royal Opera House at which the event had been held since 2008.

In 2017, the German music group Kraftwerk played sold-out concerts in 3D on three evenings.

In 2018, a sold-out 4 May performance by blues belter Beth Hart was filmed and the subsequent 'Beth Hart live at The Royal Albert Hall' DVD was released on 30 November.  The WWE held its second United Kingdom Championship Tournament on 18 and 19 June. In the same year, the world premiere of PlayStation in Concert was organised at the Hall and it featured PlayStation game music from the 1990s up until then. It was arranged by Jim Fowler and performed by the Royal Philharmonic Orchestra.

Comedian Bill Burr filmed his 2019 special Paper Tiger at the Hall.

In November 2020, One Direction member Niall Horan performed a one off live-streamed show in an empty Hall (during the COVID-19 pandemic) to raise money for charity.

In 2022, Venezuelan comedian José Rafael Guzmán became the first Spanish-speaking comedian to perform at the concert hall.

Regular events

Royal Choral Society
The Royal Choral Society is the longest-running regular performance at the Hall, having given its first performance as the Royal Albert Hall Choral Society on 8 May 1872. From 1876, it established the annual Good Friday performance of Handel's Messiah.

BBC Proms

The BBC Sir Henry Wood Promenade Concerts, known as "The Proms", is a popular annual eight-week summer season of daily classical music concerts and other events at the Hall. In 1942, following the destruction of the Queen's Hall in an air raid, the Hall was chosen as the new venue for the proms. In 1944 with increased danger to the Hall, part of the proms were held in the Bedford Corn Exchange. Following the end of World War II the proms continued in the Hall and have done so annually every summer since. The event was founded in 1895, and now each season consists of over 70 concerts, in addition to a series of events at other venues across the United Kingdom on the last night. In 2009, the total number of concerts reached 100 for the first time. Jiří Bělohlávek described The Proms as "the world's largest and most democratic musical festival" of all such events in the world of classical music festivals.

Proms (short for promenade concerts) is a term which arose from the original practice of the audience promenading, or strolling, in some areas during the concert. Proms concert-goers, particularly those who stand, are sometimes described as "Promenaders", but are most commonly referred to as "Prommers".

Tennis
Tennis was first played at the Hall in March 1970, and the ATP Champions Tour Masters was played annually every December from 1997 to 2021 before changing venues in 2022.

Classical Spectacular
Classical Spectacular, a Raymond Gubbay production, performed at the Hall from 1988 to 2022. It combined popular classical music, lights and special effects.

Cirque du Soleil
Cirque du Soleil has performed annually, with a show being staged every January that the Hall was open for since 2003. Cirque has had to adapt many of their touring shows to perform at the venue, modifying the set, usually built for arenas or big top tents instead. The following shows have played the RAH: Saltimbanco (1996, 1997 and 2003), Alegría (1998, 1999, 2006 and 2007), Dralion (2004 and 2005), Varekai (2008 and 2010), Quidam (2009 and 2014), Totem (2011, 2012 and 2019), Koozå (2013 and 2015), Amaluna (2016 and 2017), OVO (2018), Luzia (2020 and 2022) and most recently Kurios (2023). No show took place in 2021 as the Hall was closed to the public at the time. Amaluna's visit in 2016 marked Cirque's '20 years of Cirque at the Royal Albert Hall' celebration.

Classic Brit Awards
The Classic Brit Awards was hosted annually at the Hall from 2000 to 2013, and again in 2018. It is organised by the British Phonographic Industry.

Festival of Remembrance

The Royal British Legion Festival of Remembrance is held annually the day before Remembrance Sunday.

Institute of Directors
For over 60 years the Institute of Directors' Annual Convention was synonymous with the Hall, although in 2011 and 2012 it was held at indigO2. The last took place in 2016.

English National Ballet
Since 1998 the English National Ballet has had several specially staged arena summer seasons in partnership with the Hall and Raymond Gubbay. These include Strictly Gershwin, June 2008 and 2011, Swan Lake, June 2002, 2004, 2007, 2010 and 2013, Romeo & Juliet (Deane), June 2001 and 2005, and The Sleeping Beauty, April – June 2000.

The Salvation Army
The Hall has a long association with The Salvation Army, hosting over 400 events since 1895. It continues to host the Salvation Army's annual Christmas concert, featuring celebrity guests and Salvation Army musicians, including the International Staff Songsters and International Staff Band.

Teenage Cancer Trust
Starting in the year 2000 the Teenage Cancer Trust has held annual charity concerts (with the exception of 2001). They started as a one-off event but have expanded over the years to a week or more of evenings events. Roger Daltrey of the Who has been intimately involved with the planning of the events.

Graduation ceremonies
The Hall is used annually by the neighbouring Imperial College London and the Royal College of Art for graduation ceremonies. For several years the University of London and Kingston University also held its graduation ceremonies at the Hall.

Films, premières and live orchestra screenings
The venue has screened several films since the early silent days. It was the only London venue to show William Fox's The Queen of Sheba in the 1920s.

The Hall has hosted many premières, including the UK première of Fritz Lang's Die Nibelungen, 101 Dalmatians on 4 December 1996, the European première of Spandau Ballet's Soul Boys of the Western World and four James Bond royal world premières; Die Another Day on 18 November 2002 (attended by Queen Elizabeth II and Prince Philip), Skyfall on 23 October 2012 (attended by Charles, Prince of Wales and Camilla, Duchess of Cornwall), Spectre on 26 October 2015 (attended by Prince William, Duke of Cambridge and Catherine, Duchess of Cambridge) and No Time to Die on 28 September 2021 (attended by Charles, Camilla, William, Catherine).

The Hall held its first 3D world première of Titanic 3D, on 27 March 2012, with James Cameron and Kate Winslet in attendance. Since 2009, the Hall has also curated regular seasons of English-language film-and-live-orchestra screenings, including The Lord of the Rings trilogy, Gladiator, Star Trek, Star Trek Into Darkness, Interstellar, The Matrix, West Side Story, Breakfast at Tiffany's, Back to the Future, Jaws, Harry Potter and the Chamber of Secrets, and the world première of Titanic Live in Concert. The only non-English-language movie to have been screened at the Hall is Baahubali: The Beginning (an Indian movie in Telugu and Tamil, but premiered Hindi dubbed version).

National Brass Band Championships of Great Britain

The National Brass Band Championships of Great Britain, one of the most prestigious prizes in the annual brass band contesting calendar, holds the Final of the Championship section at the Royal Albert Hall each October

Beyond the main stage
The Hall hosts hundreds of events and activities beyond its main auditorium.
There are regular free art exhibitions in the ground floor Amphi corridor, which can be viewed when attending events or on dedicated viewing dates.
Visitors can take a guided tour of the Hall on most days. The most common is the one-hour Grand Tour which includes most front-of-house areas, the auditorium, the Gallery and the Royal Retiring Room. Other tours include Story of the Proms, Behind the Scenes, Inside Out and School tours.
Children's events include Storytelling and Music Sessions for ages four and under. These take place in the Door 3 Porch and Albert's Band sessions in the Elgar Room during school holidays.
"Live Music in Verdi" takes place in the Italian restaurant on a Friday night featuring different artists each week.
"Late Night Jazz" events in the Elgar Room, generally on a Thursday night, feature cabaret-style seating and a relaxed atmosphere with drinks available.
"Classical Coffee Mornings" are held on Sundays in the Elgar Room with musicians from the Royal College of Music accompanied with drinks and pastries.
Sunday brunch events take place in Verdi Italian restaurant and feature different genres of music.

Regular performers

Eric Clapton is a regular performer at the Hall. Since 1964, Clapton has performed at the Hall over 200 times, and has stated that performing at the venue is like "playing in my front room". In December 1964, Clapton made his first appearance at the Hall with the Yardbirds. It was also the venue for his band Cream's farewell concerts in 1968 and reunion shows in 2005. He also instigated the Concert for George, which was held at the Hall on 29 November 2002 to pay tribute to Clapton's lifelong friend, former Beatle George Harrison. Clapton passed 200 shows at the Hall in 2015.

Shirley Bassey is one of the Hall's most prolific female headline performers having appeared 45 times at the venue since 1971. In 2001, she sang "Happy Birthday" for the Duke of Edinburgh's 80th birthday concert. In 2007, she sang at Fashion Rocks in aid of the Prince's Trust. On 30 March 2011, she sang at a gala celebrating the 80th birthday of Mikhail Gorbachev. In May 2011, she performed at the Classic Brit Awards, singing "Goldfinger" in tribute to the recently deceased composer John Barry. On 20 June 2011, she returned and sang "Diamonds Are Forever" and "Goldfinger", accompanied by the Royal Philharmonic Orchestra, as the climax to the memorial concert for Barry.

James Last appeared 90 times at the Hall between 1973 and 2015, making him the most frequent non–British performer to have played the venue.

Education and outreach programme

The hall's education and outreach programme engages with more than 200,000 people a year. It includes workshops for local teenagers led by musicians such as Foals, Jake Bugg, Emeli Sandé, Nicola Benedetti, Alison Balsom First Aid Kit and John Legend, innovative science and maths lessons, visits to local residential homes from the venue's in-house group, Albert's Band, under the 'Songbook' banner, and the Friendship Matinee: an orchestral concert for community groups, with £5 admission.

Management
The Hall is managed day to day by the chief executive Craig Hassall and six senior executives. They are accountable to the Council of the corporation, which is the Trustee body of the charity. The council is composed of the annually elected president, currently Ian McCulloch, 18 elected Members (either corporate or individual seat owners) and five Appointed Members, one each from Imperial College London, Royal Commission for the Exhibition of 1851, Department for Culture, Media and Sport, British Museum of Natural History and the Royal College of Music.

Awards
The Hall has won several awards across different categories.
 From 1994 to 1998 and in 2003, the Hall won 'International Venue of the Year' in the Pollstar Awards.
 In 2004 and 2005, the Hall won 'International Small Venue of the Year' in the Pollstar Awards.
 In 2006 to 2010, the Hall won 'International Theatre of the Year' in the Pollstar Awards.
 The Hall has won International Live Music Conference Award for 'First Venue to Come into Your Head' in 1998, 2009 and 2013.
 From 2008 to 2012, the Hall was voted Superbrands leading Leisure and Entertainment Destination.
 On 17 October 2012, the Hall won 'London Live Music Venue of the Year' at the third annual London Lifestyle Awards.
 The Hall won the Showcase Award for Teenage Cancer Trust and Event Space of the Year (non-Exhibition), both at the Event Awards 2010.
 In 2010 and 2011, the Hall won 'Best Venue Teamwork Award' at the Live UK Summit.
 The 'Life at the Hall blog won 'Best Venue Blog' at the Prestigious Star Awards in 2012 and the Prestigious Star Award Landmark in 2013.

Pop culture references

A large mural by Peter Blake, titled Appearing at the Royal Albert Hall, is displayed in the Hall's Café Bar. Unveiled in April 2014, it shows more than 400 famous figures who have appeared on the stage.

In 1955, English film director Alfred Hitchcock filmed the climax of The Man Who Knew Too Much at the Hall. The 15-minute sequence featured James Stewart, Doris Day and composer Bernard Herrmann, and was filmed partly in the Queen's Box. Hitchcock was a long-time patron of the Hall and had already set the finale of his 1927 film The Ring at the venue, as well as his first version of The Man Who Knew Too Much (1934), starring Leslie Banks, Edna Best and Peter Lorre.

Other notable films shot at the Hall include Major Barbara, Love Story, The Seventh Veil, The Ipcress File, A Touch of Class, Shine, and Spice World.

In the song "A Day in the Life" by the Beatles, the Albert Hall is mentioned. The verse goes as follows:

I read the news today, oh boy
four thousand holes in Blackburn, Lancashire
and though the holes were rather small
they had to count them all
now they know how many holes it takes to fill the Albert Hall
I'd love to turn you on.

The song "Session Man" by The Kinks references the Hall:

He never will forget at all
The day he played at Albert Hall.

In the song "Shame" by Robbie Williams and Take That's Gary Barlow, Barlow mentions the Hall in his verse:

I read your mind and tried to call, my tears could fill the Albert Hall.

Fittingly, the Albert Hall was the venue for Williams' first public reunion with his former band Take That, after a 14-year hiatus from the band.

In some variants of "Hitler Has Only Got One Ball", Hitler's second testicle is mentioned as being in the Hall.

Transport links
London Buses routes 9, 23, 52, 360, 452 and night route N9 serve the venue.

The nearest London Underground stations are Gloucester Road, High Street Kensington, Knightsbridge and South Kensington.

See also

Albertopolis
 The Great Exhibition
 Exhibition Road
 Prince Albert
 List of concert halls
 List of tallest domes

References

External links

 Official site with timeline
 Read a detailed historical record about the Hall
 Architecture of the Hall from the Royal Institute of British Architects
 
 Royal Albert Hall Survey of London entry
 Albert Hall (Victorian London)

 
Concert halls in London
Grade I listed buildings in the City of Westminster
Romanesque Revival architecture in England
Terracotta
Grade I listed concert halls
Music venues completed in 1871
Rotundas in the United Kingdom
Domes
Ballet venues in the United Kingdom
Tourist attractions in the City of Westminster
Monuments and memorials to Albert, Prince Consort
Round buildings
South Kensington
Wightman Cup
1871 establishments in England
Live albums recorded at the Royal Albert Hall